William Geer may refer to:
 William Dudley Geer, Christian educator 
 William C. Geer, chemist known for inventing the aircraft deicing boot
 Will Geer, American actor, musician, and social activist